Those Were the Days is a 1995 French drama film directed by Didier Haudepin. It was screened in the Un Certain Regard section at the 1995 Cannes Film Festival.

Cast
 Élodie Bouchez - Delphine
 Melvil Poupaud - Axel
 Sophie Aubry - Claude
 Gaël Morel - Bertrand
 Myriam Boyer - Bertrand's mother 
 Marcel Bozonnet - a khâgne teacher
 Benjamin Mercier - Pierre
 Bégonia Zuazaga - Bégonia
 Nicolas Koretzky - André
 Estelle Larrivaz - Estelle
 Sylvie Testud - Sylvie
 Tara Römer - Michel
 Richard Djoudi - Olivier
 Laurent Morel - Charles
 Nils Ohlund - Niels

References

External links

1995 films
1990s French-language films
1995 drama films
Films directed by Didier Haudepin
French drama films
1990s French films